Pashmak Panadeh (also Romanized as Pashmak Panādeh and Pashmak Panāh Deh; also known as Pashmak) is a village in Fajr Rural District, in the Central District of Gonbad-e Qabus County, Golestan Province, Iran. At the 2006 census, its population was 1,954, in 414 families.

References 

Populated places in Gonbad-e Kavus County